The 2017 Honduran Cup was the 12th edition of the Honduran Cup and the third as Copa Presidente. The cup is a creation of the Honduran government funded by money allocated to national security fund.  Its purpose is to support the growth of sport to detract the youth from vices and to promote national tourism for rural towns.

The cup was contested by 64 teams from the top 3 divisions of the country.  There were a total of 10 teams from Liga Nacional (1st division), 27 from Liga de Ascenso (2nd division) and 27 from Liga Mayor (3rd division).  Unlike the previous tournament which covered two calendar years, this edition was played in 2017 only.

Juticalpa were the defending champions, but they were eliminated in the round of 16 by Deportes Savio.

The final was held at Estadio Juan Ramón Brevé Vargas in Juticalpa, Olancho. C.D. Marathón as winners, qualified to the 2017 Honduran Supercup.

Schedule and format
The first round started on 21 January.  Unlike the previous editions, no third place match was played and the quarterfinals were single matches instead of two-legged ties.

Round of 64

Round of 32

Round of 16
All round of 16 matches were originally scheduled for 15 March 2017, but were rescheduled to 22 March due to a lack of funding.

Quarterfinals
Unlike previous editions of this tournament, the quarter-finals consisted of single matches instead of two-legged ties.

Semifinals

First legs

Second legs

Final

References

Honduran Cup seasons
Cup